The 2012 Asian Men's Volleyball Cup, so-called 2012 AVC Cup for Men was the third edition of the Asian Cup, played by top eight teams of the 2011 Asian Championship. The tournament was held at Vinh Yen Gymnasium, Vĩnh Yên, Vietnam from 1 to 7 September 2012.

Pools composition
The teams are seeded based on their final ranking at the 2011 Asian Men's Volleyball Championship.

Venue
 Vinh Yen Gymnasium, Vĩnh Yên, Vietnam

Preliminary round

Pool A

|}

|}

Pool B

|}

|}

Final round

Quarterfinals

|}

5th–8th semifinals

|}

Semifinals

|}

7th place

|}

5th place

|}

3rd place

|}

Final

|}

Final standing

Awards
MVP:  Zhan Guojun
Best Scorer:  Gurinder Singh
Best Spiker:  Zhong Weijun
Best Blocker:  Alireza Jadidi
Best Server:  Mohammad Taher Vadi
Best Setter:  Hideomi Fukatsu
Best Libero:  Kong Fanwei

References

External links
Asian Volleyball Confederation

Asian Men's Volleyball Cup
AVC Cup
V
V